Veinte Para Las Doce is the second album released by Mexican rock band, Coda. It was recorded on Jacob's Studios at Farnham, England and released in 1995. The album was produced by Robin Black who had previously worked with Pink Floyd, Black Sabbath, Bee Gees, and Supertramp. The arrangements were done by Spike Edney, keyboardist of Queen. The power ballad "Aún" includes a string arrangement by Edney.

Track listing
 "Pon El Mundo A Girar" - 4:04 
 "Si Te Tuviera Aquí" - 4:55 
 "Dame Un Poco De Tiempo" - 4:22 
 "Aún" - 4:53 
 "Otro Tono Al Gris" - 4:25 
 "Veinte Para Las Doce" - 5:01 
 "Frío" - 4:23 
 "Solo" - 4:38 
 "No Puedo Estar Sin Tí" - 3:43 
 "Sed" - 3:23 
 "Nada En Común" - 4:02

Personnel
 Salvador Aguilar - lead vocals
 Toño Ruiz - guitars
 Eloy Sánchez  - drums
 Allan Pérez - bass
 David Melchor - keyboards

Notes

References
Album Info at Heavy Harmonies.
[ Veinte Para Las Doce] in AllMusic

1995 albums
Coda (band) albums